The Real Folk Blues is an album by blues musician John Lee Hooker that was recorded in Chicago in 1966 and released by the Chess label. Additional tracks from the sessions were released as More Real Folk Blues: The Missing Album in 1991.

Reception

AllMusic reviewer Stephen Cook stated: "Listeners wanting to find a comprehensive collection of Hooker's work may not find it here, but they certainly won't be disappointed once the needle hits the grooves on this solid 1966 Chess release by the blues master. Featuring nine Hooker originals, the set is a fetching mix of raucously fun up-tempo cuts and starkly slow classics."

Track listing
All compositions credited to John Lee Hooker
 "Let's Go Out Tonight" – 7:05
 "Peace Lovin' Man" – 3:48
 "Stella Mae" – 2:59
 "I Put My Trust in You" – 5:15
 "I'm in the Mood" – 2:41
 "You Know, I Know" – 3:46
 "I'll Never Trust Your Love Again" – 3:20
 "One Bourbon, One Scotch, One Beer" – 2:58
 "The Waterfront" – 5:25

Personnel
John Lee Hooker – guitar, vocals
Lafayette Leake – piano, organ
Eddie Burns – guitar (tracks 1-8)
Other unidentified musicians – bass, tambourine
S.P. Leary or possibly Fred Below – drums

References

John Lee Hooker albums
1966 albums
Chess Records albums